The 2018 Indian Premier League Final was a day/night Twenty20 cricket match played between Sunrisers Hyderabad and Chennai Super Kings, on 27 May 2018 at the Wankhede Stadium, Mumbai. It was to determine the winner of the 2018 season of the Indian Premier League, an annual Twenty20 tournament in India. For the first time in the history of IPL, the final was played on 19:00 IST, with all the finals of previous ten seasons played at 20:00 IST.

Chennai defeated Hyderabad by 8 wickets to win their third IPL title. Shane Watson of Chennai won the player of the match award for his innings of 117 not out off 57 balls.

Road to the final

League stage

League Meet-ups

Details
Shane Watson single-handedly won it for CSK by hitting a magnificent century in the biggest game of the season. He made 117 runs. He had scored a century in the earlier stage of the tournament. Ambati Rayudu hit the winning runs for CSK. SRH bowlers looked out of form, with Bhuvneshwar Kumar and Rashid Khan posing as a threat for CSK as all the other bowlers leaked runs heavily. With this win, CSK lifted the IPL trophy for the 3rd time in their seventh appearance in an IPL final.

SRH Innings
After a slow start, opening batsmanShikhar Dhawan tried to up the ante against the strict bowling. Uncapped Bowler and Former SRH player Karn Sharma was introduced into the attack in the 7th over. Both Dhawan and  captain Williamson were keeping it slow and steady going for a boundary every over. SRH could only add 18 runs in the last 2 overs. SRH had posted a total of 178/6 which was just about par.

CSK Innings
Faf du Plessis and Shane Watson opened the innings for CSK while Bhuvneshwar Kumar bowled the first over for his team. The Super Kings lost du Plessis early but Watson and Raina did not give the Sunrisers any chance to bounce back with their 117-run partnership. Though Watson started slowly playing out Bhuvneshwar's overs, he pummeled the other Sunrisers bowlers to reach his second century in the IPL season. After Raina's departure, Rayudu joined hands with Watson to complete the chase for the Super Kings and helped them lift their third IPL trophy.

Match officials and result
 On-field umpires: Marais Erasmus (South Africa) & Sundaram Ravi (India)
 Toss: Chennai Super Kings won the toss and elected to field.
 Man of the match: Shane Watson
 Result: Chennai Super Kings won by 8 wickets
Hyderabad Batting

Chennai Bowling

Chennai Batting

Hyderabad Bowling

References

2018 in Indian cricket
Final
May 2018 sports events in India